Arthur Desrosiers (March 10, 1884 – July 7, 1951) was a medical doctor and mayor of Eastview, Ontario, later known as Vanier. He also represented Russell in the Legislative Assembly of Ontario as a Liberal from 1934 to 1937.

Background
He was born in Clarence Creek, Ontario in 1884, the son of Dr. Alexis Napoléon Desrosiers and Ernestine Dionne who was the daughter of Amable Dionne. He attended Collège Bourget in Rigaud, Quebec and then studied medicine at the Université Laval.

Politics
He was mayor of Eastview in 1918–1919, 1922 and 1924 to 1927. During his time as mayor, he favoured annexation of Eastview by the nearby city of Ottawa. Desrosiers drowned in 1951 while boating in the Rideau River. He was survived by his two daughters, Pauline and Lucette.

References 
Vanier (Eastview) Au Temps Des Maires, Léo Paquette (1998) 
 Canadian Parliamentary Guide, 1937, AL Normandin

External links 
 

1884 births
1951 deaths
Mayors of Eastview and Vanier
Franco-Ontarian people
Ontario Liberal Party MPPs
People from Clarence-Rockland